The 2020 Japan Curling Championships, or the 37th Zen-Noh Japan Curling Championships, the Japanese national men's and women's curling championships, were held from February 8 to 16 in 2020 at the Karuizawa Ice Park in Karuizawa, Nagano.
These championships were organized by the Japan Curling Association, and sponsored primarily by Zen-Noh.
The women's winner was to represent Japan at the 2020 World Women's Curling Championship, but the event was cancelled due to the COVID-19 pandemic.

Men

Qualification

Notes
  Without last winner and runner-up team at end of last October.

Teams
The teams are listed as follows

Round-robin standings
Final round-robin standings

Round-robin results
All draw times are listed in Japan Standard Time (UTC+9).

Draw 2
Sunday, February 9, 13:30

Draw 4
Monday, February 10, 9:00

Draw 6
Monday, February 10, 18:00

Draw 8
Tuesday, February 11, 13:30

Draw 10
Wednesday, February 12, 9:00

Draw 12
Wednesday, February 12, 18:00

Draw 14
Thursday, February 13, 13:30

Draw 16
Friday, February 14, 9:00

Draw 18
Friday, February 14, 18:00

Playoffs

Quarter-finals
Saturday, February 15, 10:00

Semi-final
Saturday, February 15, 15:00

Gold-medal game
Sunday, February 16, 10:00

Final standings

Women

Qualification

Notes
  Without last winner and runner-up team at end of last October.

Teams
The teams are listed as follows:

Round-robin standings
Final round-robin standings

Round-robin results
All draw times are listed in Japan Standard Time (UTC+9).

Draw 1
Sunday, February 9, 9:00

Draw 3
Sunday, February 9, 18:00

Draw 5
Monday, February 10, 13:30

Draw 7
Tuesday, February 11, 9:00

Draw 9
Tuesday, February 11, 18:00

Draw 11
Wednesday, February 12, 13:30

Draw 13
Thursday, February 13, 9:00

Draw 15
Thursday, February 13, 18:00

Draw 17
Friday, February 14, 13:30

Playoffs

Quarter-finals
Saturday, February 15, 10:00

Semi-final
Saturday, February 15, 15:00

Gold-medal game
Sunday, February 16, 15:30

Final standings

References

External links
 37th Zen-Noh Japan Curling Championships 2020 -  Official website 
 37th Japan Curling Championships - Japan Curling Association 
 NHK Curling 2020 - Live scores and Satellite broadcasting information 
  37th Japan Curling Championships Online Stream - Official Live Channel on YouTube 

2020
2020 in curling
Karuizawa, Nagano
Sport in Nagano Prefecture
2020 in Japanese sport
February 2020 sports events in Japan